Brian Chewe (born 28 June 1993) is a Zambian football striker who currently plays for Konkola Blades F.C.

References

1993 births
Living people
Zambian footballers
Zambia international footballers
Konkola Blades F.C. players
Association football forwards